Opus Dei in society refers to the social mission, general social strategy, social activities, work, relationship with politics and other aspects of Opus Dei.

Mission in society and general strategy

According to Catholic officials and scholars, Opus Dei is God's Work performing a divine operation in society which mobilises Christians to sanctify secular realities from within. Opus Dei does not act as a group, they say. It is a spiritual, catechetical agency of the Catholic Church in charge of forming people so they can act with personal responsibility "to put Christ on top of all human activities," as their founder says.

Escriva said that Opus Dei evangelises people of all social classes: "Out of a hundred souls, we are interested in one hundred." Opus Dei’s Statutes says that the goal of Opus Dei is to bring about that persons of all walks of life, first of all the intellectuals, practice Christianity through the sanctification of their work "so that all things will be put in order according to the Will of the Creator."

According to Vittorio Messori in his book Opus Dei: Leadership and Vision in Today’s Catholic Church, Opus Dei’s manner of influencing society is based on the principle that "there is no way of improving humanity other than improving human beings—one by one, and profoundly." Thus it has what it calls apostolate of friendship. Also, it follows the strategy of emphasising the evangelisation of the intelligentsia because, he says, "society arrives at the majority of its ideas and modes of behavior by way of the intellectuals."

So that the sanctification of society can take place through sanctification of work, the Opus Dei provides "professional formation." This stresses hard work, cultural and professional development, human warmth and refinement, ethical behaviour, respect for freedom and pluralism, personal and collective humility, and personal prayer as the highest priority in one's daily schedule.

The main strategy, according to Escrivá's teaching, is that each Christian must strive to become a "canonizable saint", another Christ redeeming all men and women, and thus also a responsible citizen who works for the common good. Because if Christians are not well ordered from within, he says, if they do not put God first through a life of contemplation, they will be merely spreading their disorder to other people. "These world crises", he says, "are crises of saints." Thus, evangelization in Opus Dei is done one-on-one through its "apostolate of friendship and confidence."

Peter L. Berger and Samuel Huntington calls the attempt of Opus Dei an "alternative modernity," a work towards a modern world which is "faithful" to the Christian traditions, as distinguished from other secular interventions in modernity. (Many Globalizations: Cultural Diversity in the Contemporary World 2002)

Activities and work

The largest part of the apostolic activity of the prelature is what the individual members do with their friends and colleagues in their respective communities and workplaces. Collective formative activities consist of religious retreats, recollections, and classes in Catholic doctrine.

A big percentage of the undertakings of members of Opus Dei, if not the majority, are youth development centres: schools, youth clubs, study centres. There are also a good number of training centres for women.

In Spain, Saint Josemaría Escrivá himself founded the University of Navarra in 1959 which confers 27 degrees and administers more than 300 post-graduate programs and includes a teaching hospital.

Opus Dei academic institutions

Schools
PARED Harkaway Hills College, Melbourne, Australia
PARED Montgrove School for Girls, Sydney, Australia
PARED Redfield College, Sydney, Australia
PARED Tangara School for Girls, Sydney, Australia
PARED Wollemi College, Sydney, Australia
PAREF Southridge School, Muntinlupa, Philippines
PAREF Woodrose School, Muntinlupa, Philippines
PAREF Springdale School, Cebu City, Philippines
PAREF Westbridge School, Iloilo City, Philippines
PAREF Rosehill School, Antipolo, Philippines
PAREF Northfield School, Antipolo, Philippines
PAREF Southcrest School, Cebu City, Philippines
Rosevale School, Cagayan de Oro, Philippines
Seido-Mikawadai College, Nagasaki, Japan
Tak Sun Secondary School, Hong Kong
The Heights School, Maryland, USA

Universities
Universities operated by or related to Opus Dei are

Centro de Extensão Universitária, São Paulo, Brazil
IAE Business School, Buenos Aires, Argentina
IESE Business School, Barcelona, Spain
Instituto Panamericano de Alta Dirección de Empresa (IPADE), Mexico D.F., Mexico
ISE - Instituto Superior de Empresa, São Paulo, Brazil
PAD: Escuela de Alta Dirección de la Universidad de Piura, Lima, Peru
Pan-Atlantic University, Lagos, Nigeria
Pontifical University of the Holy Cross, Rome, Italy
Strathmore University, Nairobi, Kenya
Universidad Austral, Buenos Aires, Argentina 
Universidad Bonaterra, Aguascalientes, Mexico
Universidad de La Sabana, Chía, Colombia
Universidad de Los Hemisferios, Quito, Ecuador
Universidad de Montevideo, Montevideo, Uruguay 
Universidad del Istmo, Fraijanes, Guatemala
Universidad Monteávila, Caracas, Venezuela 
Universidad Panamericana, Mexico D.F., Mexico
Università Campus Bio-Medico, Rome, Italy
Universitat Internacional de Catalunya, Barcelona, Spain
University of Asia and the Pacific, Pasig, Philippines
University of Navarra, Pamplona, Spain
University of Piura, Piura, Peru
University of the Andes, Santiago, Chile
Villanueva University, Madrid, Spain

Membership profile
The Vatican Yearbook indicates that Opus Dei has 85,000 members about 1,900 of whom are priests. Of these 1,900 priests, 25 are bishops working in various dioceses. Members are distributed as follows: Africa 1600; Asia and the Pacific 4700; Americas, North and South 29,000; Europe 48,700.

In terms of educational level, income and social status, V. Messori says that there is a predominance of middle-to-low levels among the members of Opus Dei. In Spain and Latin America, for example, Opus Dei is predominantly popular among laborers and campesinos. Gomez Perez, in Opus Dei: Una Explicación, says that Opus Dei's social composition shows a correspondence with the local situation, because, he says, all honest trades can be sanctified. He also says that there are more teachers and professors among its ranks than the normal social composition because of Opus Dei's emphasis on the intellectual apostolate.

Critics, however, accuse Opus Dei of elitism, and say that Opus Dei has amassed both power and wealth. On the other hand, John Allen in Opus Dei: Secrets and Power in the Catholic Church, says that Opus Dei's assets in the World are estimated to be at $2,800 million minimum, compared with an annual revenue for the Catholic Church in the US of $102 billion. By comparison, General Motors has assets of $455 billion. The worldwide revenue of Opus Dei is that of a mid-sized American diocese. He also says that Opus Dei has only 39 bishops out of the 4,564 in the world. And there are only 20 members out of 3920 working in the Vatican. As to real estate holdings, Opus Dei's holdings are notably inferior to those of the religious orders, says V. Messori. "Monks live in communities that require houses, while the great majority of Opus Dei members continue to live their everyday lives in their own homes."

Revolutionary or conservative?
Opus Dei's influence in society, said Escrivá, is not socio-economic but ethical: rich and poor work together to build a society that is more human, just, and progressive.

However, in "Preserving Power and Privilege," a report of Catholics for a Free Choice, Opus Dei is categorised together with Neocatechumenal Way, Focolare, Legion of Christ, Community of St. John, Charismatic Renewal, and Communion and Liberation, among Catholic groups having "neoconservative or fundamentalist moral and political beliefs," "extremely traditionalist," and "pre-enlightenment" messages for society.

In contrast, Benedict XVI praises the catechetical work of these lay organizations and commented on the profile of Opus Dei as "this surprising link between absolute fidelity to the great tradition of the Church and to her faith, with a disarming simplicity and unconditional openness to all the challenges of this world, in the academic world, in the world of work, in the world of economics, etc." There are also modern historians, many of whom are non-Catholics, who are now stating that the Catholic Church supports reason and progress, putting it "at the center of the development of the values, ideas, science, laws, and institutions which constitute what we call Western civilization," in the words of Paul Legutko of Stanford University in his review of Thomas Woods' book How the Catholic Church Built Western Civilization, Woods refers to both non-Catholic and Catholic historians of science: J.L. Heilbron, Alistair Cameron Crombie, David C. Lindberg, Edward Grant, and Thomas Goldstein, Stanley Jaki; economists: Joseph Schumpeter and Raymund de Roover; art historians: Kenneth Clark, Samuel Edgerton; historian of hospitals: Guenter B. Risse. Wood's book supports Christopher Dawson's thesis about religion "as the dynamic element in history and as a real world-transforming power."

The debate about Opus Dei and its role in society continues. The two diametrically opposed positions are reflected in how one interprets point 353 of Escrivá's The Way:

Critics say this type of counsel makes it impossible for Opus Dei members to be free in political matters, since it creates ideologies such as "National Catholicism", according to Alberto Moncada, or "Catholic Totalitarianism," according to Argentine Marxist historian Emilio Corbiere. Thus, Opus Dei members are placed squarely on the political right, becoming a conservative influence in world affairs, promoting the Vatican's traditionalist policies against divorce, abortion, euthanasia, gay marriages, contraception, etc. “The claim that Opus Dei is merely a humanitarian organization with no political agenda is simply not credible,” said Frances Kissling, president of Catholics for a Free Choice.  Opus Dei, according to its critics, serves as the Vatican's instrument to oppose the liberal and secular thought expressed by John Stuart Mill's classic statement: "The only freedom which deserves the name, is that of pursuing our own good in our own way," and lately put into American jurisprudence in Planned Parenthood vs. Casey 1992, “At the heart of liberty is the right to define one’s own concept of existence, of the universe, and of the mystery of human life."

On the other hand, while espousing respect for each person's freedom of religion and search for truth, Ratzinger says that when there is rebellion against the light of truth revealed by Christ on man's origin and purpose, man is imprisoned in a meaningless existence.  The "attempt to be our own god, creator and judge," he stated in The Way of the Cross, leads to self-destruction. The "choice of error does not liberate," says Escrivá, and brings instead the "slavery of sin." His supporters say that the Catholic Church per se is beyond earthly power struggles and is engaged in a fundamental struggle for the peace and happiness of each soul: the battle between the powers of evil and the God-man Jesus Christ who, in the words of Opus Dei's founder, "never loses battles."

According to Escrivá, "face-to-face with God, there is no room for anonymity: either one decides to be his friend or his foe." He also states in a key teaching: "Many great things depend — don't forget it — on whether you and I live our lives as God wants." His supporters say that if Christians throughout the world are completely faithful to the Beauty of Truth, Jesus Christ, then "the greatest revolution of all time would take place," according to what they see as the prophetic vision of Opus Dei's founder, a vision altogether dismissed by its many critics.

References

External links
Vatican Official Assails a Myth About New Church Movements: Sees Them as Committed to Social and Charitable Work

Opus Dei